The Hope Front was a Peruvian political party. Founded in December 2015 by former congressman and government minister Fernando Olivera, he was nominated for the Presidency in the 2016 general election.

History 
At the general election held on 10 April 2016, the party's ticket won 1.3% of the popular vote, placing seventh. At congressional level, the party won 1.2% and no seats in the Congress of the Republic.  Upon the results of the 2016 general election on 10 April 2016, presidential nominee Fernando Olivera announced he would found a successor party to the Hope Front in order to run again for President of Peru at the 2021 general election.

The party was subsequently cancelled by the National Elections Jury in July 2017 along other parties that failed to pass the electoral threshold.

Front of Hope 2021 
On October 30, 2020, the National Elections Jury approved the list of affiliates of Frente de la Esperanza 2021, Olivera's new party, to be able to be registered and participate in the general elections of Peru in 2021. The next day Olivera announced that he was going to run for the presidency of Peru.

Election results

Presidential election

Elections to the Congress of the Republic

See also
 Independent Moralizing Front
 Front of Hope 2021

References

2015 establishments in Peru
2016 disestablishments in Peru
Defunct political parties in Peru
Political parties established in 2015
Political parties disestablished in 2016